Lucrèce Borgia (also known as Lucretia Borgia or Sins of the Borgias) is a 1953 French drama film starring Martine Carol and Pedro Armendáriz. The film was directed by Christian-Jaque, who co-wrote screenplay with Cécil Saint-Laurent and Jacques Sigurd, based on a novel by Alfred Schirokauer. The film tells the story of the Borgia family of Italy during the Renaissance.

It was released on DVD in the US on May 26, 2009.

Cast
Martine Carol – Lucrece Borgia
Pedro Armendáriz – Cesar Borgia
Massimo Serato – Duke of Aragon
Valentine Tessier – Julie Farmesa
Louis Seigner – Mage, Soothsayer
Arnoldo Foà – Micheletto
Christian Marquand – Paolo
Tania Fédor – Vanna
Georges Lannes – Ambassador
Maurice Ronet – Perott

Notes

External links

Lucrèce Borgia at filmsdefrance.com

1950s historical drama films
1953 films
Films based on German novels
Films directed by Christian-Jaque
Films set in the 1490s
Films set in the 16th century
Films set in Italy
Films set in Rome
French historical drama films
Italian historical drama films
Films produced by Angelo Rizzoli
Cultural depictions of Cesare Borgia
Cultural depictions of Lucrezia Borgia
1950s French-language films
1950s French films
1950s Italian films